Bad, Bad Bunny Trouble is a 1994 children's picture book written and illustrated by Hans Wilhelm. It is the second book of the Bunny Trouble trilogy, a series about Ralph, a soccer-loving rabbit who frequently causes trouble with his family and friends. It is preceded by Bunny Trouble and followed by More Bunny Trouble.

Plot summary
After spoiling the coffee cake at his sister Liza's birthday party, Ralph is banished to the attic, but then he has to use his best soccer kick to save his family from a gang of hungry foxes.

References

1994 children's books
American children's books
American picture books
Talking animals in fiction
Books about rabbits and hares
Books about foxes